was a Japanese prince. He was a son of Emperor Ingyō.

Prince Kinashi no Karu, Princess Karu no Ōiratsume, Prince Anaho (Emperor Ankō) and Prince Ōhatsuse Wakatake (Emperor Yūryaku) were born as children of Ingyō and Oshisaka no Ōnakatsuhime. Prince Kinashi no Karu was the first son of his father.

Prince Kinashi no Karu was elected as the crown prince, but was accused of an incestuous relationship with his sister, Princess Karu no Ōiratsume. 

After his father’s death, Anaho battled with Kinashi no Karu. Anaho defeated Kinashi no Karu, becoming Emperor Ankō. According to Kojiki, Kinashi no Karu was sent into exile to Iyo Province and then committed suicide.

According to Nihon Shoki, Karu no Ōiratsume was sent into exile to Iyo Province during the reign of her father because of their incestuous relationship and Prince Kinashi no Karu committed suicide during the battle with Anaho.

References

External links
Nihon Shoki Online English translations. Scroll 13 - Emperors Ingyo and Anko

Incest
Japanese princes
People of Kofun-period Japan
Suicides in Japan
Ancient people who committed suicide
Sons of emperors
450s deaths